Manila held its local elections on Monday, May 13, 2019, as a part of the 2019 Philippine general election. Voters elected candidates for mayor, vice mayor, 6 congressmen, and the 36 councilors that would be members of the City Council. There are a total of 736,156 people who voted out of the 1,065,149 city's registered voters. Francisco "Isko Moreno" Domagoso won the elections, enabling him to serve a three-year term as the mayor of Manila. His running mate, the incumbent vice mayor Maria Sheilah "Honey" Lacuna-Pangan, once again topped the vice mayoral race, securing her to serve her second three-year term as the city's vice mayor.

Electoral system

For mayor, vice mayor and House district representatives 
The winner is elected via the first-past-the-post system. The mayor and vice mayor are elected separately, and are elected at-large. Representatives are elected from each of Manila's six congressional districts.

For councilors 
The winners are elected via multiple non-transferable vote in each of Manila's six city council districts (coextensive with the congressional districts). A voter has six votes, and can vote up to six people. The six candidates with the highest number of votes in each district wins.

Candidates

Team Legacy: Sulong Maynila

Batang Maynila

Team Lim

Team Ninong Lacsamana

Pederalismo ng Dugong Dakilang Samahan

Partido ng Manggagawa at Magsasaka

Independents

Mayoralty and vice mayoral elections

Mayor

Joseph Estrada is running for his third term as the Mayor of Manila. Meanwhile, Alfredo Lim is seeking to make his comeback as the mayor after being defeated by Estrada twice in the 2013 and 2016 elections. Meanwhile, Francisco "Isko Moreno" Domagoso, the youngest mayoralty candidate and who served as Vice Mayor for both Estrada and Lim, is running for the first time as the mayor. Lim is the only mayoral candidate without a running mate.

Vice Mayor

Ma. Sheilah "Honey" Lacuna-Pangan is running for her second term.

House of Representatives elections

1st District
Manuel Luis "Manny" Lopez (NPC, supported by PDP-Laban and KKK) is the incumbent, and he will face former representative Benjamin "Atong" Asilo to contest a second term. Lopez is the son of former Manila Mayor Mel Lopez. Asenso Manileño did not nominate any candidate in this district.

2nd District
Carlo Lopez is the incumbent, and is term-limited. His cousin Alex is running under the Nacionalista Party, with support from PMP and KABAKA; Carlo is a member of PDP-Laban. Also running are incumbent councilors Rolan Valeriano (Asenso Manileño) and Rodolfo "Ninong" Lacsamana (NUP). The coalition of PDP-Laban and KKK did not nominate any candidate in this district.

3rd District
John Marvin "Yul Servo" Nieto is the incumbent, and was running under the PDP-Laban banner with support from Asenso Manileño. He faced former representative Zenaida "Naida" Angping, who was running under Lakas–CMD and supported by PMP and KABAKA.

4th District
Edward Maceda is the incumbent and ran against former representative Maria Theresa "Trisha" Bonoan-David (NUP, supported by Asenso Manileño) and independent candidate barangay kagawad Christopher "Chris" Gabriel. This is the second time that the PDP-Laban-KKK coalition chose not to nominate any candidate.

5th District
Amanda Cristina "Cristal" Bagatsing is the incumbent, and will face former councilor Arnold "Ali" Atienza. Bagatsing supported Estrada's re-election bid. Both Asenso Manileño and PDP-Laban-KKK did not have a candidate.

6th District
Rosenda Ann "Sandy" Ocampo is the incumbent but she is now term-limited. She has endorsed her younger sister Patricia Yvette Ocampo, to run for her seat in the House of Representatives. Yvette registered as a candidate under Bagumbayan-VNP (supported by PDP-Laban and Alfredo Lim's KKK Party) and prior to her candidacy had been appointed by President Rodrigo Duterte as chair of the Nayong Pilipino Foundation. However, even after Lim's endorsement, the Ocampos chose to campaign for Estrada's re-election. Ocampo's arch-rival, former representative Bienvenido "Benny" Abante, is also running under Asenso Manileño, as well as incumbent City Councilor and fiscal Casimiro Sison under Pwersa ng Masang Pilipino's Team Legacy.

City Council elections

1st District

 

|-
| colspan="5" style="background:black;"|

2nd District

|-
| colspan="5" style="background:black;"|

3rd District

|-
| colspan="5" style="background:black;"|

4th District

| colspan="5" style="background:black;"|

5th District

|-
| colspan="5" style="background:black;"|

6th District

|-
| colspan="5" style="background:black;"|

References

2019 Philippine local elections
Elections in Manila
Politics of Manila
May 2019 events in the Philippines
2019 elections in Metro Manila